Anarsia tegumentus is a moth in the family Gelechiidae. It was described by Rose and Pathania in 2003. It is found in India (Uttaranchal).

References

Moths described in 2003
tegumentus
Moths of Asia